Thanlyin (or ; , ; formerly Syriam) is a major port city of Myanmar, located across Bago River from the city of Yangon. Thanlyin Township comprises 17 quarters and 28 village tracts. It is home to the largest port in the country, Thilawa port.

History
Thanlyin first came to prominence in the 15th century as the main port city of the Hanthawaddy Kingdom, replacing a silted up Bago port. In 1539, the city became part of the Kingdom of Taungoo. In 1599, the city fell to the Rakhine forces led by the Portuguese mercenary Filipe de Brito e Nicote, who was made governor of the city. De Brito declared independence from his nominal Rakhine masters in 1603, defeated the invading Rakhine navy in 1604 and 1605, and successfully established Portuguese rule over Syriam or Sirião -as it was called back then- under the Portuguese viceroy of Goa. In 1613, Burmese king Anaukpetlun recaptured the city, and executed Brito by impalement, a punishment reserved for defilers of Buddhist temples.

Thanlyin remained the major port of the Taungoo kingdom until the mid-18th century. In the 1740s, Thanlyin was made the base of the French East India Company for their help in the Mon's reestablishment of Hanthawaddy Kingdom. The arrangement lasted until 1756 when King Alaungpaya of Konbaung dynasty captured the city. From then on, the importance has shifted to Yangon across the river, which Alaungpaya founded just a year earlier.

Thanlyin became part of the British Empire in 1852 after the Second Anglo-Burmese War. The British made the city into the oil refinery center of the country in the early 20th century to process the oil shipped from central Burma. The refinery was destroyed during World War II. The Thanlyin refinery was rebuilt in 1957, and underwent expansion in 1979 with Japanese assistance. In 1979 a pipeline was completed between Syriam and the Mann oilfield.

Since the 1990s, the city has undergone major changes. Thanlyin was finally connected to Yangon by road in 1993 when the Thanlyin Bridge was built. In the late 1990s, Thilawa Port was built to handle the container ships away from Yangon's ports. The city is home to a national university in Myanmar Maritime University, and local universities in the University of East Yangon and Technological University, Thanlyin. The city's population has increased from 43,000 in 1983 to 123,000 in 1996.

Transport
Thanlyin is connected to the country's fledgling highway network. The Thanlyin Bridge carries Highway 6, which links Yangon with the Thilawa port and Thanlyin Industrial Zone. The Thanlyin Bridge 2, under construction since 2003, will link Thanlyin to Highway 2, the Yangon-Mandalay highway.  River ferries to the Irrawaddy delta over the Twante Canal are available from Yangon's passenger ports.

Economy
Thilawa port is the largest deep water sea port in the country, and handles the majority of the shipped imports and exports to/from the country.

Education
Thanlyin is home to Myanmar Maritime University, one of the most selective universities in Burma. Since the early 2000s, students from Thanlyin and surrounding suburbs have to attend local universities: the University of East Yangon for liberal arts and sciences,  Technological University, Thanlyin for engineering and Co-operative University, Thanlyin for business.

Points of interest
 Kyaik Khauk Pagoda
Portuguese church ruins (built around 1750)

See also
Almandine

References

External links

Populated places in Yangon Region
Townships of Yangon Region
Township capitals of Myanmar